The Gauliga Saxony was the highest football league in the German state of Saxony (German:Sachsen) from 1933 to 1945. Shortly after the formation of the league, the Nazis reorganised the administrative regions in Germany, and the Gau Saxony replaced the state Saxony.

Overview
The league was introduced by the Nazi Sports Office in 1933, after the Nazi takeover of power in Germany. It replaced the Bezirksligas and Oberligas as the highest level of play in German football competitions.

In its first season, the league had eleven clubs, playing each other once at home and once away. The league champion then qualified for the German championship. The bottom three teams were relegated. The season after, the league was reduced to ten teams. It operated on the same modus until the outbreak of World War II  in 1939.

Due to the effects of the war, the 1939–40 season was played in two regional groups of six teams each with a home-and-away final between the two group winners.

During the war years, the Dresdner SC became a dominating force in German football, with two championships, in 1943 and 1944, a lost final in 1940 and two cup wins in 1940 and 1941. The VfB Leipzig was the other team from the league with a national title, winning the German Cup in 1936. Those successes made the Gauliga Sachsen one of the strongest competitions in the country.

In the 1940–41 season, the Gauliga Sachsen returned to a single division format, now with twelve clubs. This number was reduced to ten for the next season and remained at this strength until 1944.

The imminent collapse of Nazi Germany in 1945 gravely affected all Gauligas and football in the region was split into seven regional groups. However, none of them played more than a few games before the arrival of the Red Army, and the end of the war terminated all competitions.

Aftermath
With the end of the Nazi era, the Gauligas ceased to exist and the region found itself in the Soviet occupation zone. The DDR-Oberliga was formed in the following years as the highest level of play in the new country of East Germany and the region became part of the East German football league system.

Virtually all football clubs in the region were dissolved and replaced with clubs controlled by the new communist government. Of those, some readopted the pre-1945 names after the German reunification in 1990.

Founding members of the league
The eleven founding members and their league placing in 1932-33 were:
 Dresdner SC, champion Ostsachsen division
 VfB Leipzig
 Polizei SV Chemnitz, champion Mittelsachsen division
 SV Guts Muts Dresden
 Wacker Leipzig, champions Nordwestsachsen division
 VfB Glauchau, champion Westsachsen division
 Plauener SuBC
 Planitzer SC
 Chemnitzer BC
 VFC Plauen
 SpVgg Falkenstein, champion Vogtland division

Winners and runners-up of the league
The winners and runners-up of the league:

Placings in the league 1933-44
The complete list of all clubs participating in the league:

References

Sources
 Die deutschen Gauligen 1933-45 - Heft 1-3  Tables of the Gauligas 1933–45, publisher: DSFS
 Kicker Almanach,  The yearbook on German football from Bundesliga to Oberliga, since 1937, published by the Kicker Sports Magazine

External links
  The Gauligas Das Deutsche Fussball Archiv
 Germany - Championships 1902-1945 at RSSSF.com

Sports leagues established in 1933
1933 establishments in Germany
1945 disestablishments in Germany
Gauliga
Football competitions in Saxony